Hanna Bahdanovich (born October 14, 1983), also transliterated as Anna Bagdanovich, is a track and field sprint athlete who competes internationally for Belarus.

Bahdanovich represented Belarus at the 2008 Summer Olympics in Beijing. She competed at the 4x100 metres relay together with Yuliya Nestsiarenka, Aksana Drahun and Nastassia Shuliak. In their first round heat they placed sixth with a time of 43.69 seconds, which was the 9th time overall out of sixteen participating nations. With this result they failed to qualify for the final.

References

1983 births
Living people
Belarusian female sprinters
Olympic athletes of Belarus
Athletes (track and field) at the 2008 Summer Olympics
Olympic female sprinters
Athletes from Minsk